Mesraba  is a Syrian village located in Douma District, Rif Dimashq. According to the Syria Central Bureau of Statistics (CBS), Mesraba had a population of 5,942 in the 2004 census.

References 

Populated places in Douma District